Hardlife Zvirekwi (born 5 May 1987) is a Zimbabwean professional footballer, who plays as a defender for CAPS United and the Zimbabwe national team.

Career

Club
Zvirekwi started his career with Gunners and he won the Zimbabwe Premier Soccer League title in 2009 as Gunners finished five points clear of Dynamos. He remained a Gunners player for four years in total until he departed in 2013 to join CAPS United. In January 2016, Zvirekwi signed a new three-year deal with CAPS Utd.

International
Zvirekwi made his international debut for Zimbabwe on 9 June 2013 in a 2–4 defeat versus Egypt in a 2014 FIFA World Cup qualifier. Two more appearances followed for him against Mozambique and South Africa in 2013. In January 2014, coach Ian Gorowa, invited him to be a part of the Zimbabwe squad for the 2014 African Nations Championship. He helped the team to a fourth-place finish after being defeated by Nigeria by a goal to nil.

Six appearances followed at the 2014 African Nations Championship. Zvirekwi had to wait two more years until his next Zimbabwe caps when he was selected for the 2016 African Nations Championship, he played in all three of Zimbabwe's fixtures in the competition.

Personal life 
In March 2018, Zvirekwi had his left hand amputated by surgeons following a car crash in Harare.

Career statistics

International
.

Honours

Club
Gunners 
Zimbabwe Premier Soccer League (1): 2009

Individual
CAPS United
 Soccer Star of the Year (1): 2016

References

External links
 

Living people
Zimbabwean footballers
Zimbabwe A' international footballers
2014 African Nations Championship players
2016 African Nations Championship players
2017 Africa Cup of Nations players
1987 births
CAPS United players
Gunners F.C. players
Association football defenders
Zimbabwe international footballers